In metadata, a vocabulary-based transformation (VBT) is a transformation aided by the use of a semantic equivalence statements within a controlled vocabulary.

Many organizations today require communication between two or more computers.  Although many standards exist to exchange data between computers such as HTML or email, there is still much structured information that needs to be exchanged between computers that is not standardized.  The process of mapping one source of data into another is often a slow and labor-intensive process.

VBT is a possible way to avoid much of the time and cost of manual data mapping using traditional extract, transform, load technologies.

History 

The term vocabulary-based transformation was first defined by Roy Shulte of the Gartner Group around May 2003 and appeared in annual "hype-cycle" for integration.

Application 
VBT allows computer systems integrators to more automatically "look up" the definitions of data elements in a centralized data dictionary and use that definition and the equivalent mappings to transform that data element into a foreign namespace.

The Web Ontology Language (OWL) language also support three semantic equivalence statements.

Companies or products 
 IONA Technologies
 Contivo and Delta by Liaison Technologies
 enLeague Systems
 ItemField
 Unicorn Solutions
 Vitria Technology
 Zonar

See also 
 Controlled vocabulary
 Data dictionary
 Enterprise application integration
 Metadata
 Semantic equivalence
 Semantic spectrum
 XSLT

External links
 Gartner Glossary of Terms Gartner definition Vocabulary-based transformation
 Gartner Hype Cycle 2003

Data management